The Atlantic Hockey Individual Sportsmanship Award is an annual award given out at the conclusion of the Atlantic Hockey regular season to the player best exemplifying the qualities of sportsmanship in the conference as voted by the coaches of each Atlantic Hockey team.

Award winners

Winners by school

Winners by position

References 

Sportsman
College ice hockey trophies and awards in the United States
Atlantic